Pionerskaya metro station may refer to:
Pionerskaya metro station (disambiguation), name of several metro stations in Russia
Pionerskaya rail station, a closed rail station in Saint Peterburg, Russia